Aulacodes pulchralis is a moth in the family Crambidae. It was described by Walter Rothschild in 1915. It is found in New Guinea.

References

Acentropinae
Moths described in 1915